Carbia calefacta is a moth in the  family Geometridae. It is found on Borneo. The habitat consists of mountainous areas.

References

Moths described in 1941
Eupitheciini
Moths of Indonesia